Linnik's theorem in analytic number theory answers a natural question after Dirichlet's theorem on arithmetic progressions. It asserts that there exist positive c and L such that, if we denote p(a,d) the least prime in the arithmetic progression

where n runs through the positive integers and a and d are any given positive coprime integers with 1 ≤ a ≤ d − 1, then:

 

The theorem is named after Yuri Vladimirovich Linnik, who proved it in 1944. Although Linnik's proof showed c and L to be effectively computable, he provided no numerical values for them.

It follows from Zsigmondy's theorem that p(1,d) ≤ 2d − 1, for all d ≥ 3. It is known that p(1,p) ≤ Lp, for all primes p ≥ 5, as Lp is congruent to 1 modulo p for all prime numbers p, where Lp denotes the p-th Lucas number. Just like Mersenne numbers, Lucas numbers with prime indices have divisors of the form 2kp+1.

Properties 

It is known that L ≤ 2 for almost all integers d.

On the generalized Riemann hypothesis it can be shown that

 

where  is the totient function,
and the stronger bound

 
has been also proved.

It is also conjectured that:

Bounds for L 
The constant L is called Linnik's constant and the following table shows the progress that has been made on determining its size.

Moreover, in Heath-Brown's result the constant c is effectively computable.

Notes

Theorems in analytic number theory
Theorems about prime numbers